John William Ponsonby, 4th Earl of Bessborough, PC (31 August 1781 – 16 May 1847), known as Viscount Duncannon from 1793 to 1844, was a British Whig politician. He was notably Home Secretary in 1834 and served as Lord Lieutenant of Ireland between 1846 and 1847, the first years of the Great Famine.

Background and education

A member of the prominent Ponsonby family of Cumberland, he was the eldest son of Frederick Ponsonby, 3rd Earl of Bessborough, and Lady Henrietta Frances Spencer, daughter of John Spencer, 1st Earl Spencer. Sir Frederick Cavendish Ponsonby and William Ponsonby, 1st Baron de Mauley, were his younger brothers, while Lady Caroline Lamb was his younger sister. Ponsonby's mother was Lord Granville's lover prior to his marriage to Lady Harriet Cavendish, the Countess of Bessborough's niece. Lord Granville fathered two illegitimate children through her: Harriette Stewart and George Stewart. Lord Bessborough was educated at Harrow and Christ Church, Oxford.

Political career
He was First Commissioner of Woods and Forests under Lord Grey (1831–1834) and served under Lord Melbourne in that office (1835–1841), briefly as Home Secretary (1834), and as Lord Privy Seal (1835–1839). Later, he served as Lord Lieutenant of Ireland under Lord John Russell from 1846 until his death on 16 May 1847.  During his service the Great Famine (Ireland) progressed. He was made a Privy Counsellor in 1831 and in 1834, ten years before he succeeded his father, he was created Baron Duncannon, of Bessborough in the County of Kilkenny. He was Lord Lieutenant of Kilkenny from November 1838 until his death.

He had a stammer, which made him a very reluctant public speaker, believing that it hampered his political career. As Lord Duncannon, he was unkindly nicknamed "Dumbcannon". In private on the other hand, he was regarded as a valued colleague in Government, due largely to his ability to keep his head in a crisis. He was one of the so-called Committee of Four who drafted the Reform Act 1832.

Family

John Ponsonby married Lady Maria Fane, daughter of John Fane, 10th Earl of Westmorland, and his wife Sarah (née Child), on 16 November 1805 at Berkeley Square, London. They had eight sons and six daughters. Their daughter Lady Emily Charlotte Mary remained unmarried but she wrote a number of novels which were published without attribution. Through his daughter Lady Augusta Gore, Bessborough was the grandfather of sportsman Spencer Gore, who won the first Wimbledon singles title in 1877, and the Rt. Rev. Charles Gore, the Bishop of Oxford.

Children of Lord and Lady Bessborough:

 Lady Georgiana Sarah Ponsonby (15 August 1807 – 25 June 1861), married Rev. Sackville Bourke, nephew of the Earl of Mayo
 John George Brabazon Ponsonby, 5th Earl of Bessborough (14 October 1809 – 28 January 1880)
 William Wentworth Brabazon Ponsonby (29 December 1812 – 8 July 1831)
 Lady Augusta Lavinia Priscilla Ponsonby (11 May 1814 – 19 November 1904), married firstly William Petty-FitzMaurice, Earl of Kerry, 1834; secondly, the Hon. Charles Alexander Gore, 1845
 Frederick George Brabazon Ponsonby, 6th Earl of Bessborough (11 September 1815 – 11 March 1895)
 Lady Emily Charlotte Mary Ponsonby (17 February 1817 – 3 February 1877)
 Lady Maria Jane Elizabeth Ponsonby  (14 March 1819 – 13 September 1897), married her cousin Hon. Charles Ponsonby, 2nd Baron de Mauley
 Hon. George Arthur Brabazon Ponsonby (17 May 1820 – 1841)
 Reverend Walter William Brabazon Ponsonby, 7th Earl of Bessborough (13 August 1821 – 24 February 1906)
 Rt. Hon. Sir Spencer Cecil Ponsonby-Fane (14 March 1824 – 1 December 1915)
 Lady Harriet Frederica Anne Ponsonby (17 June 1825 – 16 November 1900)
 Lady Kathleen Louisa Georgina Ponsonby (30 August 1826 – 9 July 1863), married Frederick Edward Bunbury Tighe
 Son, died in infancy (28 May 1828 – 5 July 1828)
 Hon. Gerald Henry Brabazon Ponsonby  (17 July 1829 – 30 November 1908), married Maria Emma Catherine Coventry

The Viscountess Duncannon died in March 1834, aged 46. Lord Bessborough survived her by thirteen years and died in May 1847, aged 65. He was succeeded in the earldom by his eldest son, John, and subsequently by his younger sons Frederick and Walter. Bessborough Gardens in London is named after Lord Bessborough.

References

External links 
 

1781 births
1847 deaths
John Ponsonby, 4th Earl of Bessborough
Lord-Lieutenants of Carlow
Lord-Lieutenants of Kilkenny
Lords Lieutenant of Ireland
Lords Privy Seal
Members of the Privy Council of the United Kingdom
Duncannon, John Ponsonby, Viscount
Secretaries of State for the Home Department
Duncannon, John Ponsonby, Viscount
Duncannon, John Ponsonby, Viscount
Duncannon, John Ponsonby, Viscount
Duncannon, John Ponsonby, Viscount
Duncannon, John Ponsonby, Viscount
Duncannon, John Ponsonby, Viscount
Duncannon, John Ponsonby, Viscount
Duncannon, John Ponsonby, Viscount
Duncannon, John Ponsonby, Viscount
UK MPs who inherited peerages
UK MPs who were granted peerages
People educated at Harrow School
Members of the Parliament of the United Kingdom for County Cork constituencies (1801–1922)
Members of the Parliament of the United Kingdom for County Kilkenny constituencies (1801–1922)
John 04
Peers of the United Kingdom created by William IV